The 2014 FIBA 3x3 World Tour Manila Masters was a 3x3 basketball tournament held in Mandaluyong, Metro Manila, Philippines at the SM Megamall from 19–20 July 2014. The top two best teams, Doha and Manila West qualified for the 2014 FIBA 3x3 World Tour Final.

Participants
12 teams qualified to participate at the Manila Masters. India's team Team Bangalore J.U. qualified but later withdrew from the tournament. Team Medan, fourth-place winner of the Indonesian qualifiers replaced Team Bangalore.

Preliminary round

Pool A

|}

Pool B

|}

Pool C

|}

Pool D

|}

Final round

Final standings

References

External links
Manila Masters Official Website

2014 FIBA 3x3 World Tour
International basketball competitions hosted by the Philippines
2014–15 in Philippine basketball
Sport in Mandaluyong